O'Connor Island is a rocky island,  long, lying between Holl and Ford Islands in the southern part of the Windmill Islands of Wilkes Land, Antarctica.

Discovery and naming
The island was first mapped from aerial photos taken by United States Navy Operation Highjump and Operation Windmill in 1947 and 1948. It was named by the Advisory Committee on Antarctic Names (US-ACAN) for Joseph (Jerry) J. O'Connor, who served as air crewman with the eastern task group of U.S. Navy Operation Highjump, 1946–47, and assisted U.S. Navy Operation Windmill parties in establishing astronomical control stations between the Wilhelm II Coast and Budd Coast during the 1947–48 season.

Important Bird Area
A 1,052 ha site comprising both O'Connor Island and neighbouring Holl Island has been designated an Important Bird Area (IBA) by BirdLife International because it supports about 30,000 breeding Adélie penguinss, estimated from 2011 satellite imagery. Other birds recorded as breeding in the IBA include snow petrels, Cape petrels, south polar skuas, Wilson's storm petrels and southern fulmars.

See also 
 Composite Antarctic Gazetteer
 List of Antarctic and Subantarctic islands
 List of Antarctic islands south of 60° S
 SCAR
 Territorial claims in Antarctica

References

External links

Important Bird Areas of Antarctica
Seabird colonies
Penguin colonies
Windmill Islands